Kozul (Közül) is a rural locality (a selo) and the administrative centre of Kozulskoye Rural Settlement, Ust-Kansky District, the Altai Republic, Russia. The population was 501 as of 2016. There are 6 streets.

Geography 
Kozul is located 10 km southeast of Ust-Kan (the district's administrative centre) by road. Kaysyn and Ust-Kan are the nearest rural localities.

References 

Rural localities in Ust-Kansky District